Wake Up Screaming (or variants) may refer to:

Books
I Wake Up Screaming (novel) by Steve Fisher (writer), who co-wrote the film screenplay with Dwight Taylor

Film
I Wake Up Screaming 1941 film noir, with Betty Grable, Victor Mature and Carole Landis
Wake Up Screaming: A Vans Warped Tour Documentary 2006 featuring band Strike Anywhere

Music

Albums
I Wake Up Screaming (album) Kid Creole & the Coconuts 2011
Wake Up Screaming (Slick Shoes album) 2000
Wake Up Screaming, album by F-Minus 2003
Wake Up Screaming, album by Every Mother's Nightmare 1993
Wake Up Screaming (Impaler album)
Woke Up Screaming, album by  Bobby Blue Bland 1974

Songs

"Wake Up Screaming", song by Ray Manzarek (Manzarek, Danny Sugerman) from The Whole Thing Started with Rock & Roll Now It's Out of Control 1974
"Wake Up Screaming", song by Witchfynde	Give 'Em Hell (Witchfynde album) 1981
"Wake Up Screaming", song by Wang Chung (band)	1985
"I Wake Up Screaming", song by Cinerama (band)	2013
"I Wake Up Screaming", song by Virgin Steele from The Marriage of Heaven and Hell Part I 1994
"Wake Up Screaming", song by Paul Stanley Live to Win
"Wake Up Screaming", song by Dive, written Ivens from Inside Out (Dive album) Box (Dive album) Images (EP) Scraping Tokyo '95
"Wake Up Screaming", song by Subhumans From the Cradle to the Grave (album), covered by Queens of the Stone Age on First It Giveth 
"Wake Up Screaming", song by See You Next Tuesday from This Was a Tragedy EP  2005
"Wake Up Screaming", song by Jim Lauderdale from the album Planet of Love  1991; covered by Gary Allan on Used Heart for Sale  1996